Dr. Debrework Zewdie, former Director (September 1994–November 2014) of the World Bank Global AIDS Program and Deputy Executive Director and COO of the Global Fund, is an Ethiopian national who has led strategy, policy implementation, and management of development programs at country, regional, and global levels for international bodies such as the World Bank and The Global Fund to Fight AIDS, Tuberculosis and Malaria.  As an immunologist, she conceptualized and managed the groundbreaking US$1 billion Multi-country HIV/AIDS Program that changed the AIDS funding landscape and pioneered the large-scale multi-sectorial response with direct financing to civil society and the private sector. Dr. Zewdie led the articulation of the World Bank's first global strategy on HIV/AIDS and the Global HIV/AIDS Program of Action. As a founding UNAIDS Global Coordinator, she has been instrumental in making the unique cooperative structure of the UNAIDS family a working reality, fostering strong inter-agency partnerships. She is an advocate for women's health and was a founding Vice President and member of the Society for Women and AIDS in Africa (SWAA). She established institutional rigor at the Global Fund and led its wide-ranging internal reform which culminated in the ongoing corporate transformation program. Dr. Zewdie has a Ph.D. in clinical immunology from the University of London, a postdoctoral fellowship at SYVA Company (a diagnostic company in Palo Alto, California), and was a Senior MacArthur Fellow at the Harvard Center for Population and Development Studies. Dr. Zewdie was a Richard L. and Ronay A. Menschel Senior Leadership Fellow at the Harvard T.H. Chan School of Public Health in 2015. During her Fellowship at the Harvard Chan School, she also participated as a speaker on Voices in Leadership, an original webcast series, in a discussion titled, "Leadership in Getting AIDS on the World Bank Agenda", moderated by Dr. Barry Bloom.

Education
 3/2015 - 5/2015, Richard L. and Ronay A. Menschel Senior Leadership Fellow, Harvard T.H. Chan School of Public Health, Boston, MA,  USA
 1991 – 1992, Senior MacArthur Fellow, MacArthur Population Leadership Program, Center for Population and Development Studies, Harvard University Graduate School of Education, Cambridge, MA
 1988 – 1988, International Laboratory Training, Molecular and Cellular Aspects of Immunology, Weizmann Institute of Science
 1982 – 1984, Post Doctoral Fellow, Microbiology, SYVA Company
 1979 – 1982, Doctor of Philosophy (Ph.D.), Clinical Immunology, University of London, London, United Kingdom
 1977 - 1978, St. Mary's Hospital Medical School, Department of Experimental Pathology, London, United Kingdom {where?}
 1973 – 1977, Bachelor of Science (B.Sc.), Biology (General), Addis Ababa University, Addis Ababa, the capital of Ethiopia.

Biography
 Sep 1994–Nov 2014.  Director, World Bank, Human Development Network, United States, Washington, D.C.
 Dr. Debrework Zewdie was Deputy Regional Director of the Africa Region for the AIDS Control and Prevention project (AIDSCAP) of Family Health International in Nairobi, Kenya.
 Dr. Zewdie returned to the World Bank as Senior Advisor, President's Office Special Envoy, after serving a three-year assignment as the Deputy, Executive Director and Chief Operating Officer at The Global Fund to Fight AIDS, Tuberculosis and Malaria.
 While at the Global Fund (or GFATM), she co-led the Organizational restructuring and realizing of corporate priorities by instituting efficient and effective ways of doing business. In addition, she was responsible for the institution'S day-to-day operations, short-term and medium-range planning, organizational strategy and development, and accountability, and she served as a member of its Executive Committee.  Earlier in her career, Dr. Zewdie was the Director of the Global HIV/AIDS Program at the World Bank, which pioneered the Bank's engagement in fighting the HIV/AIDS pandemic and led the Bank's effort in providing the first billion dollars for fighting HIV/AIDS in Sub-Saharan Africa.
 She has also served as Deputy Director, and later Acting Director, of the National Research Institute of Health in Ethiopia. 
 Dr. Zewdie established and headed the Referral Laboratory for HIV/AIDS in Addis Ababa, Ethiopia, served as Program Manager of Ethiopia's AIDS/STD Prevention and Control Program, and taught immunology to medical students at Addis Ababa University. 
 May 28, 2013- .  Director, Global Tb Alliance, a.k.a. TB Alliance or The Global Alliance for TB Drug Development.

Professional associations
 Director, World Bank Global HIV/AIDS Program

Selected publications
 Tamara Sonia Boender, Françoise Barré-Sinoussi, David Cooper, Eric Goosby, Catherine Hankins, Michiel Heidenrijk, Menno de Jong, Michel Kazatchkine, Fola Laoye, Michael Merson, Peter Reiss, Tobias F Rinke de Wit, Khama Rogo, Onno Schellekens, Constance Schultsz, Kim C E Sigaloff, John Simon, Debrework Zewdie.  Research in action: from AIDS to global health to impact. A symposium in recognition of the scientific contributions of Professor Joep Lange.  Antivir. Ther. (Lond.) Antivir Ther 2015 (March) 18;20(1):101-8. Epub 2015 Feb 18.  Print March 2015.  Amsterdam Institute for Global Health and Development and Department of Global Health, Academic Medical Center, University of Amsterdam, Amsterdam, the Netherlands. s.boender@aighd.org.
 Samuel Lieberman, Pablo Gottret, Ethan Yeh, Joy de Beyer, Robert Oelrichs, Debrework Zewdie.  International health financing and the response to AIDS. J Acquir Immune Defic Syndr 2009(November);52(Suppl 1):S38-44. Global HIV/AIDS Program, World Bank, Washington, DC 20433, USA.
 Peter Piot, Michael Bartos, Heidi Larson, Debrework Zewdie, Purnima Mane.  Coming to terms with complexity: a call to action for HIV prevention.  Lancet 2008(September) 5;372(9641):845-59. Epub 2008 Aug 5.  Print September 2008.  Joint United Nations Programme on HIV/AIDS (UNAIDS), Geneva, Switzerland.
 Debrework Zewdie, Pedro Cahn, Craig McClure, Jacqueline Bataringaya.  The role of HIV research in building health system capacity in developing countries.  Curr Opin HIV AIDS 2008(July);3(4):481-8.Global HIV/AIDS Program of the World Bank Human Development Network, World Bank, Washington DC, USA.
 Debrework Zewdie, Kevin De Cock, Peter Piot. Sustaining treatment costs: who will pay?  AIDS 2007(July);21(Suppl 4):S1-4. Global HIV/AIDS Program, The World Bank, 1818 H Street NW, Washington, DC 20010, USA. dzewdie@worldbank.org.  
 Debrework Zewdie, Joep Marie Albert Lange, Daniel R. Kuritzkes.  Rapid expansion of access to antiretroviral therapy (ART).  AIDS 2004(June);18(Suppl 3):S1-3. 
 Debrework Zewdie, Joep Marie Albert Lange, Jos Perriens, Daniel R. Kuritzkes.  What policymakers should know about drug resistance and adherence in the context of scaling-up treatment of HIV infection.  AIDS 2004(June);18(Suppl 3):S69-74.  International AIDS Society and International Antiviral Therapy Evaluation Center, Academic Medical Center, University of Amsterdam, The Netherlands. j.lange@amc.uva.nl.
 Daniel R. Kuritzkes, Joep Marie Albert Lange, Debrework Zewdie. World Bank meeting concludes drug resistance should not prevent distribution of antiretroviral therapy to poor countries.  Nat Med 2003;9(11):1343-4.
 Debrework Zewdie. Charging forward: leveraging a time of great momentum into concrete progress. 5th International Conference on Healthcare Resource Allocation for HIV/AIDS. April 15–17, 2002, Rio de Janeiro, Brazil.  IAPAC Mon 2002(August);8(8):235-9.  Global AIDS Campaign, World Bank, Washington, DC, USA.
 Peter Piot, Debrework Zewdie, Tomris Türmen.  HIV/AIDS prevention and treatment.  Lancet 2002(July);360(9326):86; author reply 87-8.

See also
 AIDS
 Blood tests
 Development Alternatives Incorporated
 Drug tests
 Malaria
 PharmAccess Foundation
 Screening (medicine)
 Super-spreader
 Tuberculosis

References

External links
 Dr. Barry Bloom's interview of Dr. Debrework Zewdie
 Dr. Debrework Zewdie's LinkedIn profile
 HME profile
 HSPH Profile for Dr. Debrework Zewdie
 UN Millennium Project Profile for Dr. Debrework Zewdie
 TB Alliance Profile for Dr. Debrework Zewdie
 
 PubFacts Author Profile for Dr. Debrework Zewdie - includes publications, many downloadable
 SYVA Diagnostics, Inc
 Richard L. and Ronay A. Menschel Senior Leadership Fellowship

Living people
Year of birth missing (living people)
Ethiopian women scientists
Women immunologists
20th-century women scientists
21st-century women scientists
Ethiopian immunologists
Alumni of the University of London
Addis Ababa University alumni